The Mid-America Center is an arena and convention center located in Council Bluffs, Iowa, just five minutes from downtown Omaha, Nebraska. The arena's maximum capacity is about 9,000 for concerts and 6,700 for ice hockey and arena football.  The arena continues to provide free parking. Caesars Entertainment began managing the Center in 2012, taking over from SMG.

It was the home of the Iowa Blackhawks of the APFL. From 2002 to 2009, it hosted the Omaha Lancers of the USHL. From February 19, 2011, to February 2013, it hosted roller derby bouts for the Omaha Rollergirls of the WFTDA.

From rock shows to family shows to USHL hockey to community events, the arena has hosted many top names in the music industry. The convention center has hosted the Omaha Press Club Show, Peel's Salon Shows, OWH Bridal Ideas Shows, River City Hunting & Fishing Expo and Nebraska State Bridge Tournament, which hosts Warren Buffett and Bill Gates.

Features
Arena: 30,000 square feet (pillar free), 12 Luxury Suites, 2 Party Rooms.
Convention Center:  Exhibition Hall, 120-150 Exhibit Trade Show Booths, 23,000+ square feet of Ballroom/Meeting Space, 90-112 Exhibit Trade Show Booths in Ballroom, 8 Meeting Rooms,  in Pre-Function Area.
Free Parking: 2,600 open surfaced spaces surrounding the complex

References

External links
midamericacenter.com

Convention centers in Iowa
Indoor arenas in Iowa
Indoor ice hockey venues in the United States
Music venues in Iowa
Sports venues in Iowa
Buildings and structures in Council Bluffs, Iowa
Sports venues in Omaha metro area
Tourist attractions in Pottawattamie County, Iowa
2002 establishments in Iowa
Sports venues completed in 2002
Caesars Entertainment